Ion Budai-Deleanu (January 6, 1760 – August 24, 1820) was a Romanian scholar, philologist, historian, poet, and a representative of the Transylvanian School.

He was born in Csigmó (today Cigmău), a village in the town of Algyógy (today Geoagiu, Hunedoara County), located in the western part of Transylvania. Budai-Deleanu studied at the College of Saint Barbara in Vienna. After completing his doctorate at the University of Erlau, he settled in Lemberg (now Lviv in Ukraine). He finished an epic poem, entitled Țiganiada ("Gypsy Epic"), about a band of gypsies that fought alongside the army of Vlad the Impaler, the medieval ruler of Wallachia.

He was one of the first proponents of the idea of the unification of the lands that now form Romania. He proposed that the union should be achieved under the rule of the Habsburgs, through the annexation of Wallachia and Moldavia into the Grand Principality of Transylvania.

According to Budai-Deleanu, the Dacians did not have a role in the ethnogenesis of the Romanian people. He thought that the Dacians were the ancestors of the Poles.

He promoted the purification of the Romanian language from loanwords, proposing that only borrowings from Italian and French should be permitted. He also strove for the replacement of the Cyrillic script with the Latin alphabet.

Budai-Deleanu died in Lemberg in 1820, aged 60.

Streets în Arad, Bucharest, Cluj-Napoca, Oradea, Sibiu, and Timișoara are named after him.

References

Sources

1760 births
1820 deaths
People from Geoagiu
Transylvanian School
19th-century Romanian poets
Romanian male poets